The Paragon of Animals is the 6th album produced by South Korean thrash metal band Crash, released on iTunes on August 10, 2010. A music video was filmed for lead-off track "Crashday" and is available to watch on YouTube.

Track listing
Crashday 5:00
Ruination Effect 5:31
Misguided Criminals 4:56
Revolver 5:21
Cold Blooded 5:17
Redlambs 5:38
Creeping I Am 5:05 
Atheist 4:01
Lucid Sycophant 4:20
The New Black 6:59
Fierce People 3:52

Crash (South Korean band) albums
2010 albums
Industrial metal albums
Stone Music Entertainment albums